In computer programming, the return type (or result type) defines and constrains the data type of the value returned from a subroutine or method.  In many programming languages (especially statically-typed programming languages such as C, C++, Java) the return type must be explicitly specified when declaring a function.

In the Java example:

public void setShuma(int n1, int n2) {
    Shuma = n1 + n2
}

public int getShuma() {
    return Shuma;
}

The program can therefore rely on the method returning a value of type .

public void returnNothing()

Returning a value from a method

A method returns to the code that invoked it when it completes all the statements in the method, reaches a return statement, or
throws an exception, whichever occurs first.

You declare a method's return type in its method declaration. Within the body of the method, you use the return statement to return the value.

Any method declared void doesn't return a value. It does not need to contain a return statement, but it may do so. In such a case, a return statement can be used to branch out of a control flow block and exit the method and is simply used like this:

 return;
If you try to return a value from a method that is declared void, you will get a compiler error.

Any method that is not declared void must contain a return statement with a corresponding return value, like this:

 return returnValue;
The data type of the return value must match the method's declared return type; you can't return an integer value from a method declared to return a boolean.

The getArea() method in the Rectangle Rectangle class that was discussed in the sections on objects returns an integer:
    // A method for computing the area of the rectangle
    public int getArea() {
        return width * height;
    }
This method returns the integer that the expression  evaluates to.

The getArea method returns a primitive type. A method can also return a reference type. For example, in a program to manipulate Bicycle objects, we might have a method like this:
    public Bicycle seeWhosFastest(Bicycle myBike, Bicycle yourBike,
                                  Environment env) {
        Bicycle fastest;
        // Code to calculate which bike is 
        // faster, given each bike's gear 
        // and cadence and given the 
        // environment (terrain and wind)
        return fastest;
    }

References
 

Subroutines
Articles with example Java code